Tilori Kunbi is an agricultural, landlord community in the Konkan division and Vidharba of the Indian state of Maharashtra.

They are found in Mumbai, Thane, Palghar, Raigad, Ratnagiri, Sindhudurg, Nagpur, Balaghat, Wardha and the Chandrapur districts. OBC status is accorded to the Kunbis.

Culture 
The Kuladevatas mainly worship shivling, Shiva or Shakti as Khandoba or Bhavani. Some of the members from Mumbai, Palghar, Thane and Raigad were converted to Christianity by Portuguese and have been amalgamated into East Indian Catholic community. Main festivals of this community are Shimagotsav, Chatrapati Shivaji Maharaj Jayanti, Ganesh Chaturthi and Gudi Padwa.

References

External links 

 

Agricultural castes
Other Backward Classes
Konkani people
Ratnagiri district